Los Marziano is a 2010 Argentine comedy drama film co-written and directed by Ana Katz and starring Guillermo Francella, Arturo Puig, Mercedes Morán and Rita Cortese. The story centers on a reunion between two brothers after a long period of estrangement.

Production 
Filming began on February 15, 2010. It was the last film Oscar Kramer produced shortly before his death.

Footnotes

External links 
 Official site
 
 

2010 films
Argentine comedy-drama films
Films directed by Ana Katz
2010s Argentine films